Derek Haas (born June 30, 1970) is an American writer and producer.

Life and career 
Derek Haas attended Baylor University in Waco, Texas, where he earned both his B.A. and M.A. in English Literature. He lives in Los Angeles, and has made a name as a screenwriter and co-author of several successful Hollywood films. In 2008 he published his novel The Silver Bear about the young contract killer Columbus. The sequel Columbus was released in 2009, and in 2011, Dark Men was published to complete the Silver Bear trilogy. His fourth novel, The Right Hand, was released in 2012. Haas was the editor of popcornfiction.com, where he published short stories by different authors. One of his own works, "Shake," was sold to Bruckheimer Films. Popcornfiction.com stopped publishing new stories in 2013 after Haas became too busy with television. Haas created and executive produces the NBC drama Chicago Fire, along with his writing partner Michael Brandt. His brother, Clay, has appeared in five episodes. Brandt and Haas also developed and executive produced Chicago P.D., a spin-off of Chicago Fire. Chicago Med, the second spin off of Chicago Fire premiered in November 2015.

Filmography 
Films

Television

Literature

Novels 

 Silver Bear series
 2008 The Silver Bear
 2009 Columbus, published as The Hunt for the Bear in the UK
 2011 Dark Men
 2015 A Different Lie
 2018 The Way I Die

 Others
 2012 The Right Hand

Short stories 
 2009 “Shake” - Popcorn Fiction
 2011 “Western Law” - Popcorn Fiction
 2012 “A Bad Feeling” - Popcorn Fiction
 2013 “Claustrophobia” - Popcorn Fiction
 2013 “Lie” - Kwik Krimes
 2015 “West 31st and South Halsted” - Don't Take Pictures
 2020 “Benchley” - In League with Sherlock Holmes
 2022 “Snitches Get Stitches” - Ellery Queen Mystery Magazine

References

External links 

 
 Derek Haas's homepage
 Popcorn Fiction

1970 births
American male screenwriters
Living people
Chicago (franchise)
Showrunners